Lucy Campbell may refer to:

Lucy Campbell (actress) in The Land of the Dead etc.
Lucy Campbell (mathematician)
Lucy Campbell (screenwriter), writer of Monolith (2022) starring Lily Sullivan

See also

Lucie Campbell, hymnwriter